Operation Talon may designate:

 the British amphibious landing at Akyab in western Burma on 3 January 1945, during the Burma campaign
 Operation Talon, a military operation of the Vietnam War, in September 1965
 Operation Talon (Iraq), north of Fallujah, in 2006
 Operation Talon, a deployment of Canadian troops to Afghanistan, in 2006 (see Abdul Qayyum Jamal, the ringleader of the Toronto terrorist plot of June 2006)
 Operation Talon, an Australian police operation against the Middle Eastern crime gang Brothers for Life, in Sydney, Australia, in 2017.